Into the Mirror Black is the second studio album by the band Sanctuary, released on February 27, 1990. It was their last album before their 18-year breakup from 1992 to 2010.

A video clip for the song "Future Tense" was made to promote the album. The video had some air play on MTV's Headbangers Ball. The album sold over 34,000 copies worldwide in its first week.

Release
German metal label Century Media rereleased the album as 30th anniversary edition on October 9, 2020, on CD and vinyl. This edition contains three additional studio demos and a live album that was originally released in parts on the promotional EP Into The Mirror Live / Black Reflections. All tracks were remastered by American record producer Zeuss.

Track listing

Personnel

Sanctuary
 Warrel Dane – vocals
 Lenny Rutledge – guitar
 Sean Blosl – guitar
 Jim Sheppard – bass
 Dave Budbill – drums, percussion

Technical personnel
 Howard Benson – production, arrangement, mixing
 Bruce Barris – engineering, mixing
 Joe Barresi – assistant engineering
 Joel Zimmerman – art direction
 John Halpern – photography
 Gene Kirkland – band photos

Charts

References

1990 albums
Sanctuary (band) albums
Epic Records albums
Albums produced by Howard Benson